Vasile Ștefan (born 23 October 1948) is a Romanian former footballer who played as a defender.

Honours
Rapid București
Divizia A: 1966–67
Cupa României: 1971–72, runner-up 1967–68

References

External links
Vasile Ștefan at Labtof.ro

1948 births
Living people
Romanian footballers
Association football defenders
Liga I players
FC Rapid București players